Taqiyatas district (Тақыятас районы) is a district of Karakalpakstan in Uzbekistan. The seat lies at the city Taqiyatas. It was created in 2017 from part of Xojeli district.

The district contains one city Taqiyatas, one town Naymankol and three village councils Keneges, Naymankol and Saraykol.

References

Karakalpakstan
Districts of Uzbekistan